Brešan is a surname. Notable people with the surname include:

Ivo Brešan (born 1936), Croatian playwright, novelist, and screenwriter
Vinko Brešan (born 1964), Croatian film director and son of Ivo Brešan
Andrea Bresciani (1923–2006), comics artist and illustrator whose birth name was Dušan Brešan